Samuel Oppong is a Ghanaian politician and a member of the Second Parliament of the Fourth Republic representing the Agona West Constituency in the Central Region of Ghana.

Early life 
Opoong was born in Agona West in the Central Region of Ghana.

Politics 
Oppong was first elected into Parliament on the Ticket of the National Democratic Congress for the Agona East Constituency in the Central Region of Ghana.

Oppong of the National Democratic Congress polled 19,473 votes representing 39.30% out of the 40,309 valid votes cast to win the seat, while Mr. Kofi Tawiah of the New Patriotic Party secured 14,831 votes representing 29.90%, John F. Edwin, Jnr who polled 3,362 votes, Isaac Ebo Bartels who polled 2,091 votes, Baba Rockson who polled 552 votes and Mattew Caurie who polled 0 votes. He was defeated by Samuel K. Obodai of the New Patriotic Party who polled 21,443 votes representing 57.50%.

Career 
He is a Former member of Parliament for the Agona West Constituency.

References 

Year of birth missing (living people)
Ghanaian MPs 1997–2001
People from Central Region (Ghana)
21st-century Ghanaian politicians
National Democratic Congress (Ghana) politicians
Living people